College of Forestry, OUAT Bhubaneswar is an institution in Odisha providing forestry education in the state or Odisha. Previously it was a department under college of agriculture, OUAT; when it started providing 1st Bsc (forestry) degree in India in 1987. The department has become a college in 2010.

About 
It was established as a department in College of Agriculture during the year 1987. Subsequently, it was upgraded to the College of Forestry in the year 2010 inaugurated by Sj.Naveen Patnaik, Hon’ble Chief Minister of Odisha.

Education 
The college provides 4 year bachelor's degree in BSc forestry which is allied to agriculture.
According to ICAR BSc forestry syllabus covers 47.5% of agriculture with forestry syllabus. The college also provides MSc degree in 5 disciplines of forestry.
This college has 50% reservation for Forest Range Officer as mentioned under Odisha Public Service Commission (OPSC) guidelines.

External links
 http://ouat.nic.in
 http://ouat.nic.in/collegeof_forestry
 https://www.facebook.com/cofodisha/

Forestry education in India
Universities and colleges in Bhubaneswar
Educational institutions established in 2010
2010 establishments in Orissa